The 2021 Vancouver Titans season will be the third season of Vancouver Titans's existence in the Overwatch League and the team's first full season under head coach Steven "Flubby" Coronel, after he took over the position midway through their 2020 season.

Preceding offseason

Roster changes 

The Titans entered free agency with four free agents, three of which became free agents due to the Titans not exercising the option to retain the player for another year.

Acquisitions 
The Titan' first offseason acquisitions were Jiri "Linkzr" Masalin, a veteran damage player and hitscan specialist who played three years with the Houston Outlaws, Nathan "Frd" Goebel, a tank player who "meshed well with the adaptable, aggressive" playstyle of the Atlanta Reign, and Anthony "Fire" King, a support player coming from the Reign where he saw little playing time, all of whom were announced on December 1, 2020. The team's only other signing was Kim "Teru" Min-ki, a rookie damage player coming from Overwatch Contenders Korea team O2 Blast where he won Contenders Korea championship in 2020, who was signed on January 4, 2021.

Departures 
None of the Titans' four free agents returned, three of which signed with other teams, beginning with damage player Niclas "Shockwave" Jensen, who signed with the Philadelphia Fusion on November 23, 2020. The following month, on December 18, damage player Samir "Tsuna" Ikram signed with the Paris Eternal. On February 16, 2021, tank player Alhumaidi "KSAA" Alruwaili signed with Overwatch Contenders team New Kings. Adiitionally, support player Carson "Carcar" First announced his retirement in the offseason.

Regular season

May Melee 
The Titans began their 2021 season on April 17, playing against Canadian rivals Toronto Defiant in the May Melee qualifiers. They lost their opener 1–3. Vancouver lost to the Florida Mayhem 1–3 in their following match.

Final roster

Transactions 
Transactions of/for players on the roster during the 2021 regular season:
On May 24, tank player Abtin "Shredlock" Shirvani retired.
On May 27, the Titans signed tank player Moon "ChangSik" Chang-sik.

Standings

Game log

Regular season 

|2021 season schedule

References 

Vancouver Titans
Vancouver Titans
Vancouver Titans seasons